Buxton is a village and former civil parish, now in the parish of Buxton with Lamas, in the Broadland district of the county of Norfolk, England. Buxton is located between Norwich and Aylsham and is separated from Lamas by the River Bure. In 2021 it had a population of 1295.

History
Buxton is of Anglo-Saxon and Viking origin and derives from an amalgamation of Old English and Old Norse for a settlement either named for 'Bucca' or deer.

In the Domesday Book, Buxton was recorded as a settlement of 34 households in the hundred of South Erpingham. The principal landowner was Ralph de Beaufour.

In 1931 the parish had a population of 490. On 1 April 1935 the parish was abolished to form "Buxton with Lammas".

Buxton Watermill has stood in the village in some form since before the Domesday Book and was last rebuilt in 1754 by the local merchant, William Pepper.

Nearby Dudwick Park is listed building and was built for John Wright, a Quaker banker, in the Eighteenth Century. Wright's charitable donations to the village resulted in the construction of what is now Buxton Primary School and an institution for young offenders where the Rowan House currently stands. By the Nineteenth Century, Dudwick Park had passed to the Sewell family, another Quaker family, who further extended the village school and, in 1927, funded the construction of the Village Hall. In 1937, the house was passed to Percy Briscoe, a tea-planter from Ceylon, who significantly remodeled the exterior.

The village was home to a workhouse during the Eighteenth Century due to the provisions of the English Poor Laws. The foundations of the building still exist on the Buxton-Horstead Road.

St. Andrew's Church
Buxton's Parish Church is of Norman and is dedicated to Saint Andrew. St. Andrew's was significantly remodelled in the Nineteenth Century with new stained glass being installed by Charles Edmund Clutterbuck, Thomas Willement and Ward and Hughes yet many of the corbels date from the Fourteenth Century.

Rail links 
The former Great Eastern Railway opened Buxton Lamas railway station in 1879, though this was subsequently closed in 1965.  prior to closure of the line. 

The Bure Valley Railway, operates Buxton railway station which provides services to Wroxham and Aylsham.

Notable Residents
 Thomas Cubitt- British builder and architect
 Anna Sewell- English novelist and author of Black Beauty

War Memorial
Buxton War Memorial takes the form of a Celtic cross and is located in St. Andrew's Churchyard. It lists the following names for the First World War:
 Corporal Albert E. Earl (d.1917), 7th Battalion, Royal Norfolk Regiment
 Corporal Arthur Goodson (d.1917), 9th Battalion, Royal Norfolk Regiment
 Lance-Corporal Thomas J. Smith (d.1917), 1/5th Battalion, Royal Norfolk Regiment
 Private Cyril Betts (1895-1914), 1/8th Battalion, Argyll and Sutherland Highlanders
 Private Benjamin D. Smith (1891-1916), 5th Battalion, Canadian Mounted Rifles
 Private Horace Woodhouse (1900-1918), 4th Battalion, East Yorkshire Regiment
 Private Edward F. Sword (d.1917), 17th Battalion, Royal Fusiliers
 Private Albert H. Thirtle (1899-1918), 1st Battalion, Hertfordshire Regiment
 Private Harry Barton (1885-1918), 101st Company, Labour Corps
 Private John A. Abbs (1899-1918), 10th Battalion, Lancashire Regiment
 Private George W. Kerrison (d.1916), 1st Battalion, Middlesex Regiment
 Private Robert Clarke (d.1917), 1st Battalion, Royal Norfolk Regiment
 Private George H. Goffin (1880-1920), 3rd Battalion, Royal Norfolk Regiment
 Private Herbert E. Lane (d.1918), 8th Battalion, Royal Norfolk Regiment
 Private Albert L. Cook (1895-1917), 1st Battalion, Northamptonshire Regiment
 Private Bertie C. Child (d.1918), 1/5th Battalion, Northumberland Fusiliers
 Private William F. Norgate (1891-1917), 1/5th Battalion, Northumberland Fusiliers
 Private Redcar G. Matthews (d.1917), 5th Battalion, Northumberland Fusiliers
 Private Cyril B. Tucker (d.1916), 5th Battalion, Northumberland Fusiliers
 Private Albert E. Wodehouse (1893-1916), 1/6th Battalion, Northumberland Fusiliers
 Worker Mary M. Matthews (1891-1919), Queen Mary's Army Auxiliary Corps

References

External links

Villages in Norfolk
Former civil parishes in Norfolk
Broadland